Arthur Watterson Hoppe (April 23, 1925 – February 1, 2000) was a popular columnist for the San Francisco Chronicle for more than 40 years. He was known for satirical and allegorical columns that skewered the self-important. Many columns featured whimsical characters such as expert-in-all-things Homer T. Pettibone and a presidential candidate named Nobody. Occasionally, Hoppe reined in his humor for poignant columns on serious topics, such as "To Root Against Your Country," a noted 1971 column against the Vietnam War.

Career
Hoppe began at the Chronicle as a copy boy in 1949 and was promoted to reporter before beginning his own column. As a reporter, he scooped other papers by skiing out with a photographer to the City of San Francisco train when it became snowbound in the Sierra in January 1952. At the peak of its popularity, Hoppe's column appeared in the Chronicle five days a week and was syndicated in more than 100 newspapers nationwide. His close friends included fellow columnists Russell Baker and Art Buchwald.

Hoppe received the Lifetime Achievement Award from the National Society of Newspaper Columnists in 1996. On his own initiative, he released fellow Chronicle columnist Herb Caen from a mutual vow to accept a special 1996 Pulitzer Prize.  He died from complications of lung cancer in February 2000, aged 74, survived by his wife Gloria and four children.

Publications
The Love Everybody* Crusade (* Except Antarcticans) (Doubleday, 1963)
Dreamboat, novel (Doubleday, 1964)
Our San Francisco, contributor with Kenneth Rexroth & others (Diablo Press 1964)
The Perfect Solution to Absolutely Everything (Doubleday, 1968)
Mr Nixon, and My Other Problems (Chronicle Books, 1971)
Miss Lollipop and the Doom Machine, novel (Doubleday, 1973)
Tiddling Tennis (Viking, 1977)
The Marital Arts (Arbor House, 1985)
Humor, Hope, and Humanity's Future (Nuclear Age Peace Foundation, 1987)
Having a Wonderful Time: My First Half Century as a News Paper Man, memoir (Chronicle Books 1995)
Above San Francisco, photography by Robert Cameron (Cameron & Co., 1998)

According to an obituary he also wrote two plays, including The Endless Autumn.

References

Further reading
 Hoppe, Art (November 20, 1964). "Our Man Hoppe". Carlsbad Current-Argus. p. 13

External links
Obituary in the San Francisco Chronicle
National Society of Newspaper Columnists Hall of Fame

1925 births
2000 deaths
20th-century American journalists
American columnists
Deaths from lung cancer in California
History of San Francisco
South of Market, San Francisco
San Francisco Chronicle people
20th-century American non-fiction writers